Fort Loudoun may refer to:

Fort Loudoun (Tennessee), a British colonial fort in present-day Monroe County, Tennessee, United States
Fort Loudoun (Pennsylvania), a British colonial fort in present-day Franklin County, Pennsylvania, United States
Fort Loudoun (Virginia), a British colonial fort in present-day Winchester, Virginia, United States

See also
Fort Loudon, Pennsylvania, unincorporated community at site of colonial Fort Loudoun
Fort Loudoun Dam, a hydroelectric dam on the Tennessee River in Loudon County, Tennessee, United States
Fort Loudoun Lake, a man made lake on the Tennessee River, Tennessee, United States